Edward Pratt, also known as Ed Pratt, is a British unicyclist and YouTuber best known for circumnavigating the globe on a unicycle.

World unicycle tour

Overview 
In March 2015 a then 19-year old Pratt set off from his hometown Curry Rivel, near Taunton, Somerset. He filmed his trip and posted videos about it on his YouTube channel Ed Pratt. He ended his trip at the headquarters of School in a Bag, a local charity providing backpacks containing educational tools and materials for poor and vulnerable children around the world, for which he raised over £300,000 over the course of his trip. For this achievement he was rewarded with a Points of Light award by Theresa May.

Motivation and preparation 
Pratt stated: 
The reason I've decided to undertake this ride: it's mainly just because I want to travel. I finished my A-levels last year and decided that now is probably the best time to attempt something like this. I want to see the world, and in my mind the best way to do it under my own power, from the saddle of a unicycle. My world unicycle tour will be raising money and awareness for School in a Bag [which] provides aid in the form of school bags (small rucksacks), to disadvantaged children throughout the world. Each school bag is filled with stationary, equipment and resources that will enable the child to write, draw, color, calculate, express themselves, and above all, learn. I'm aiming to raise £7,500  which is equivalent to 500 school bags. I'm a little scared about the ride but very excited. I've got no idea what'll happen, or if I can even make it, but that's kind of the point isn't: it it's an adventure. I just can't wait to get on the road and start pedaling.

Luke Simon, of School in a Bag, said: 
What we'd love to try and achieve is for Ed to actually cycle through a community or a town where we've actually distributed school bags. That would be the icing on the cake, I think, for us, and maybe for his trip too.

As part of his preparation, Pratt did a 350-mile, 10 day "really tough, but fantastic fun" practice unicycle ride, with luggage, including camping gear, from his home in Somerset to Lancaster University. He estimated that the tour itself would cover 18,000 miles and take a minimum of 18 months.

After completing the his tour, Pratt stated:
Even though I didn't follow all of Guinness's regulations, I did employ one of my own that I stuck to religiously over the three years that was if I was on land I could only make progress under my own power ... cycling or walking [and pushing the unicycle] ... The reason I think I employed this self-imposed rule was to keep myself motivated mentally when things got tough: I felt that if I allow myself to skip a section even for a couple of miles it would ultimately undermine my desire to continue. So I take pride in knowing that, apart from the watery bits, there's an unbroken unicycle tire track around the entire planet, which I think's pretty cool.

Route followed

Details 

Pratt started his journey in March 2015, heading from his hometown Curry Rivel to Chilthorne Domer, where his trip would officially start. Unfortunately, merely 7 miles after setting off, his custom made pannier bags ripped and he was forced to turn back and repair the zippers. After his false start he set off again the next day at noon. His route would take him across the English Channel into France. From here he travelled along the north coast of France towards the Netherlands and then further east across Europe.

After passing through Turkey, Georgia and Azerbaijan he crossed the Caspian Sea into Kazakhstan. It was at this point that he was being challenged by the icy and slippery wintery conditions and general lack of road safety, narrowly escaping involvement in a roadside accident. A 6-month hiatus ensued during which he resided in Bishkek, Kyrgyzstan where he taught English. After the winter he travelled back from Bishkek to the point where he last stopped unicycling in Kazakhstan and continued his unicycling trip from there.

From Kazakhstan he continued further east. He first passed through China for a total of 3,403 miles in 6 months, after which he went through Vietnam, Laos, Thailand and Malaysia. He ended the Asian leg of his trip in Singapore. From here he flew to Perth to continue across Australia and New Zealand. During his stretch across Australia Pratt crossed paths with British endurance athlete Mark Beaumont while he was on his world record attempt around the world.

The last major leg of his trip brought him across the United States, having first arrived by plane in San Francisco from Auckland, New Zealand. He crossed the US from west to east, ending his American leg in New York. From here he flew to Edinburgh to end his journey with a final 500 miles through his home country towards Somerset. He arrived back home in July 2018, more than 3 years after first setting off. In October 2018, a few months after his homecoming, he was awarded the 1015th Points of Light award and personally commended by Prime Minister Theresa May through a letter.

Throughout his whole trip he was unsupported and the total distance was completed in its entirety on, or pushing, a 36-inch unicycle.

Finances 

Pratt estimated his total spend for the tour as £22,982. The initial kit came to £1,674. The rest was spent on visas, paid transport, food and accommodation, replacement kit, and his tracker subscription. (The tracker was a device he carried which transmitted location data so that the general public could find out where he was by visiting a website. The data was updated roughly every half an hour. The device also had an SOS button.)

He estimated his income during the tour as £14,800. This came from advertising related to videos he had uploaded, teaching, and donations (these donations were money donated specifically to him, and were kept separate from donations to charity). He also got income in-kind: during the trip people sometimes gave him, or paid for, food, accommodation, transport or equipment. He often wild-camped (with no money involved).

Income continued after the tour, from giving talks, and from the videos. In a video published on 8 May 2020, Pratt said that the whole cost of the tour had been recouped.

Regarding the future, Pratt said "I'm now going on to work out to kind of turn this kind of adventuring into a business".

See also 
Around the world cycling record#Unicycling

References 

Unicyclists
1990s births
Year of birth uncertain
Living people